Cyrtodactylus dianxiensis, the western Yunnan bent-toed gecko, is a species of gecko endemic to China.

References

Cyrtodactylus
Reptiles described in 2021